Dick o the Cow is Child ballad 185 and a border ballad.  The ballad tells the story of a man who regains his stolen cows.

Synopsis

John Armstrang raids England, but finds only six sheep, which would humiliate him to steal.  He asks his companion, Billie, about a man they met; Billie says that he's a simpleton, named Dick o the Cow.  They steal his three cows.

Dick gets permission from his lord to go to Liddesdaile for revenge.  There, they taunt him.  He steals two horses.  John chases after him, on horseback, and they fight.  Dick fells him and now has three horses.  He sells one horse for money and a good milk cow.  With his lord's leave, he moves to avoid the Armstrongs.

See also 
 List of the Child Ballads
 Scottish mythology
 English folklore

References

External links
Dick o the Cow

Child Ballads
Border ballads
Northumbrian folklore
Anglo-Scottish border
Year of song unknown
Songwriter unknown